Dark Secret is a 1949 British crime film directed by Maclean Rogers and starring Dinah Sheridan, Emrys Jones and Irene Handl. It was a remake of the 1933 film The Crime at Blossoms, also directed by Rogers.

Plot
Ex-pilot Chris and his wife Valerie move into an attractive country cottage, only to become obsessed with the murdered woman who used to live there.

Cast
 Dinah Sheridan as Valerie Merryman  
 Emrys Jones as Chris Merryman  
 Irene Handl as 'Woody' Woodman  
 Hugh Pryse as A Very Late Visitor  
 Barbara Couper as Mrs. Barrington  
 Percy Marmont as Vicar  
 Geoffrey Sumner as Jack Farrell 
 Mackenzie Ward as Artist  
 Charles Hawtrey as Arthur Figson  
 John Salew as Mr. Barrington  
 George Merritt as Mr. Lumley  
 Stanley Vilven as Mr. Woodman 
 Grace Arnold as Housewife 
 Esme Beringer as Elderly Lady  
 Edgar Driver as George - Barman  
 Molly Hamley-Clifford as Fat Woman  
 Laurence Naismith as Mr. Grossmith  
 Terry Randall as Daughter  
 Johnnie Schofield as Motor Coachman

References

Bibliography
 Chibnall, Steve & McFarlane, Brian. The British 'B' Film. Palgrave MacMillan, 2009.

External links

1949 films
British crime films
1949 crime films
Films directed by Maclean Rogers
Films set in England
Films shot at Nettlefold Studios
Films produced by Ernest G. Roy
British black-and-white films
1940s English-language films
1940s British films